Pietrzaki  is a village in the administrative district of Gmina Herby, within Lubliniec County, Silesian Voivodeship, in southern Poland.

As of the end of 2011, the village has a population of 100.

References

Pietrzaki